Dugesia burmaensis is a species of freshwater dugesiid found in Burma. The species was described from six individuals collected from Inle Lake, Shan State.

References

Dugesia